Asterionellopsidaceae is a family of diatoms belonging to the order Rhaphoneidales.

Genera:
 Asterionellopsis
 Bleakeleya

References

Diatoms
Diatom families